Philip Andrew Luty (1965 - 8 April 2011) was an English activist opposing gun control, who was notable for the production of homemade firearms and manuals providing instruction at the same time. He was charged with illegal arms construction in the late 1990s and sentenced to four years in prison, with other investigations ongoing at the time of his death.

Weapons based on Luty's designs have been used or found in numerous recorded incidents of criminal or terrorist activity, including criminal groups in Australia, Brazil, Romania, Sweden, Ecuador, the United Kingdom, with terrorist organizations in Indonesia, and in an antisemitic terror incident in Germany.

Life 

Philip Luty grew up on a farm in West Yorkshire, England. He campaigned for the free possession of firearms and published instructions on self-built fully automatic weapons that can be produced by simple metalworking. Luty understood his work as a protest against the British government's prohibition of full and semi-automatic weapons.

Luty was charged with illegal arms construction in the late 1990s and sentenced to four years in prison.

In 2009, another charge was made after an armed anti-terrorist unit searched Luty's home in May 2009. Luty was subsequently tried for violating the Terrorism Act 2000. In particular, he was accused of "creating records that could be of use to a person who wants to commit or prepare a terrorist attack". He also possesed a "collection of pipes which could be screwed together to produce an item from which a bulleted cartridge could be discharged."

He had also been the prime suspect in a campaign of harassment against a local charity and property developer in Cookridge from 2006 to 2009. He was arrested for criminal damage incidents but was released due to a lack of evidence.

Death 

On 8 April 2011, Luty died after a prolonged, serious illness of cancer. The ongoing criminal case was ended because of his death.

Firearms design 

Luty designed several firearms, including four sub-machine gun designs. Of these, one particular design, outlined in his book Expedient Homemade Firearms, is the best known. This design makes extensive use of easily procured materials such as folded sheet metal, bar stock, washers, and hex screws. It is a simple blowback-operated sub-machine gun and made from entirely craft-produced components, including the magazine and pistol grip. The major drawback of such designs is the lack of rifling in the barrel, which results in poor accuracy and limited range.

Two copies of the original Luty SMG 9mm Parabellum are part of the collection of the British National Firearms Centre (NFC) and are exhibited in Leeds at the Royal Armouries Museum.

Usage of Luty-type guns 

Luty submachine guns have been documented in Australia, Brazil, Germany, Indonesia, Romania, Sweden, Ecuador, United States of America, and the United Kingdom.

Publications 

 P.A. Luty: Expedient Homemade Firearms – The 9 mm Submachine Gun. Paladin Press, 1998, 
 P.A. Luty: A Threat to Freedom of Speech in England. The Libertarian Enterprice, no 313, 3 April 2005

References

External links 

 First on Seven: Police testing a Philip Luty SMG

1965 births
2011 deaths
Firearm designers
Gunsmiths